Toru is a masculine Japanese given name.

Possible writings
Toru can be expressed with several kanji. Some examples:
 徹, "penetrate"
 透, "transparent"
 享, "enjoy"
 亨, "smoothly"
 暢, "freely"

The name can also be written in hiragana とおる or katakana トオル.

Notable people with the name
 , Japanese actor
 , Japanese karateka
 , Japanese water polo player
 , Japanese politician
 , Japanese manga artist
 , Japanese voice actor
 , Japanese actor, voice actor and narrator
 , Governor of Osaka Prefecture
 , Japanese ice hockey player
 , Japanese video game designer
 , Japanese former sumo wrestler
 , Japanese astronomer
  (born 1977), Japanese badminton player
 , Japanese voice actor
 , Japanese baseball player
 , Japanese voice actor and narrator
 , Japanese ice hockey player
 , Japanese actor, voice actor and narrator
 , Japanese manga artist
 , Japanese baseball player
 , Japanese computer network researcher and businessman
 , Japanese racing driver
 , Japanese software entrepreneur
 , Japanese composer and writer on aesthetics and music theory
 , Japanese politician
 , A perpetrator of the Tokyo subway sarin attack
 , Japanese guitarist
 , Japanese professional wrestler
 , Japanese folk singer
 , Japanese tennis player
 , Japanese footballer and manager
 , Japanese Researcher

Fictional characters
 Tōru Ichii (一井 透), in A Channel
 Tohru (トオル), in Jackie Chan Adventures
 Tohru (トオル), a character in Kare First Love
 Tohru Kobayashi (小林 トール), the titular draconian servant in Miss Kobayashi's Dragon Maid
 Toru (トオル), also known as Todd Snap, in the Pokémon anime
 Toru, in Chris Bradford's Young Samurai
 Tohru Adachi (足立 透), from the game Persona 4
 Tooru Amami (天美 透), in The World God Only Knows
 Toru Asakura (浅倉 透), in The Idolmaster Shiny Colors
 Toru (透龍), the main antagonist of JoJolion
 Toru Egawa, in Business as Usual, a Finder Series fanfiction by Kadzuki_Fuchoin
 Tōru Hagakure (葉隠 透), in My Hero Academia
 Tōru Hikawa (氷川 透), Tory Froid, in MegaMan NT Warrior
 Tohru Honda (本田 透), in Fruits Basket
 Toru Kazama (風間 トオル), in Crayon Shin-chan
 Toru Kouno (河野 亨), in Princess Princess
 Tohru Mutou (武藤 徹), in Shiki
 Tōru Mutsuki (六月 透), in Tokyo Ghoul
 Toru Narita (成田 徹), in Hot Gimmick
 Tooru Oikawa (及川 徹), in Haikyū!! with the position of captain and setter from Aoba Johsai High
 Toru Okada (岡田 亨), in The Wind-Up Bird Chronicle
 Toru Oshikiri (押切 トオル), in the series of the same name by Junji Ito
 Tōru Rikiishi (力石 徹), in Ashita no Joe
 Toru Sato (トオル・サトウ), in the game Need for Speed: Most Wanted
 Tohru Suidohbashi (水道橋 徹), of Machine Robo Rescue.
 Toru Tokugawa, in The Grimnoire Chronicles, by Larry Correia
 Tōru Watanabe (ワタナベ トオル), in Norwegian Wood
 Tōru Yasunaga (安永 透), in The Decay of the Angel

See also
 Toru (disambiguation)
 Japanese name

Japanese masculine given names
Japanese unisex given names